John Walter Ray (born 21 November 1968) is an English former footballer who played in the Football League as a defender for Colchester United.

Career

Born in Newmarket, Ray was a regular in the Colchester United youth teams and reserves, and was offered a short-term professional contract with the option of a further year towards the end of his apprenticeship with the club in the 1987–88 season after impressing manager Roger Brown. Having sat on the substitutes bench for a number of games, Ray finally played his one and only Football League game on 30 January 1988, as a substitute for Tony English, where he handled the ball to concede a penalty and allow Scarborough to score their third in a 3–1 defeat for Colchester at the McCain Stadium.

Following his solitary appearance, he went out on loan to Wycombe Wanderers alongside fellow youth product Scott Young before he was released by Colchester on his return. He subsequently joined a host of Essex-based non-league clubs, including Aveley, Barking, Billericay Town, Ford United, Grays Athletic, Romford and Tilbury.

References

1968 births
Living people
People from Newmarket, Suffolk
English footballers
Association football defenders
Colchester United F.C. players
Wycombe Wanderers F.C. players
Aveley F.C. players
Barking F.C. players
Billericay Town F.C. players
Redbridge F.C. players
Grays Athletic F.C. players
Romford F.C. players
Tilbury F.C. players
English Football League players